Gary Paul Himsworth (born 19 December 1969) is an English former footballer who made nearly 500 appearances in the Football League playing for York City, Scarborough and Darlington.

Career
Himsworth came fourth out of 10,000 entrants in a Rising Star national football competition, sponsored by Bobby Charlton, when he was 14.

Notes

1969 births
Living people
English footballers
Association football midfielders
York City F.C. players
Scarborough F.C. players
Darlington F.C. players
Footballers from North Yorkshire